Ehsan Mohajer Shojaei (born 21 March 1983 in Borujerd) is an Iranian middle distance track athlete who specialized in the 800 metres. Mohajer Shojaei was a bronze medalist in the 2006 Asian Games and 2011 Asian Athletics Championships, a competitor at the 2008 Summer Olympics, and a gold medalist at the 2007 Summer Universiade (his first gold medal in an international competition). He was born only one day off of the birth date of fellow countryman Sajjad Moradi, with whom Shojaei ran numerous 800 metres races in international competition.

Running career
Mohajer Shojaei made his debut on the world stage at the age of 19, when he ran a time of 1:50.08 (min:sec) in the 800 metres race at the 2002 Asian Junior Athletics Championships in Thailand.

He won his first gold medal at the 2007 Summer Universiade, running the 800 in 1:46.04, which at the time was his personal best. From this point he gained form for next year's Olympic Games. However, Shojaei did not qualify past the first round in the 800-m race at the 2008 Summer Olympics, running a slightly slower (in comparison to his blistering Universiade victory) 1:49.25.

Competition record

Notes

External links 

Living people
1983 births
Iranian male middle-distance runners
Olympic athletes of Iran
Athletes (track and field) at the 2008 Summer Olympics
Asian Games bronze medalists for Iran
Asian Games medalists in athletics (track and field)
Athletes (track and field) at the 2006 Asian Games
Medalists at the 2006 Asian Games
Universiade medalists in athletics (track and field)
Universiade gold medalists for Iran
Medalists at the 2007 Summer Universiade
Competitors at the 2005 Summer Universiade
People from Borujerd
20th-century Iranian people
21st-century Iranian people